Chilly Willy is a cartoon character, a diminutive penguin. He was created by director Paul Smith for the Walter Lantz studio in 1953, and developed further by Tex Avery in the two subsequent films following Smith's debut entry. The character soon became the second most popular Lantz/Universal character, behind Woody Woodpecker. Fifty Chilly Willy cartoons were produced between 1953 and 1972.

Inspiration and Conception
Chilly Willy was inspired by mystery writer Stuart Palmer, according to Scott MacGillivray's book Castle Films: A Hobbyist's Guide. Palmer used the Lantz studio as a background for his novel Cold Poison, in which the cartoon star was a penguin character, and Lantz adopted the penguin idea for the screen. The character Pablo the Penguin from the 1945 Disney film The Three Caballeros was the inspiration for Chilly Willy.
Paul J. Smith initially based Chilly's design on a separate penguin character from Lantz' 1945 cartoon Sliphorn King of Polaroo, but would later be redesigned by Tex Avery in his second appearance, I'm Cold in 1954.

Attributes and common themes
Chilly Willy appeared in 50 theatrical short subjects produced by Lantz from 1953 to 1972, most of which involve his attempts to stay warm, and often meeting opposition from a dog named Smedley (voiced by Daws Butler in his "Huckleberry Hound" voice). Smedley has a large mouth and sharp-pointed teeth (which he shows off when yawning), but is never shown viciously trying to bite Chilly or anyone else with them. There were times, however, when Chilly and Smedley got along, as they did in Vicious Viking and Fractured Friendship. However, Chilly never referred to Smedley by name. Most times that Chilly was in opposition with Smedley, it wound up with the two of them being friends at the end. Chilly was more of a nuisance to Smedley than an enemy, often showing up where Smedley is working, usually for some mean employer. Many times, the notion of a plot was extremely weak, appearing to be a random collection of loosely related gags as opposed to a coherent story.

Two of Chilly's friends in the later cartoons were Maxie the Polar Bear (voiced by Daws Butler) and Gooney the "Gooney Bird" Albatross (voiced by Daws Butler impersonating Joe E. Brown). Maxie has appeared with Chilly more than Gooney has. There have been only two cartoons in which all three characters have appeared together: Gooney's Goofy Landings (where Chilly and Maxie try to perfect Gooney's landings) and Airlift a la Carte (where Chilly, Maxie, and Gooney go to the store owned by Smedley).

In some episodes, Chilly Willy also deals with a hunter named Colonel Pot Shot (voiced by Daws Butler) whom Smedley has been shown to work for in some episodes. Pot Shot would give orders in a calm controlled voice, and then would explode in rage when he told Smedley what would happen should he fail in his objective. Also, two episodes had Chilly Willy outsmarting Wally Walrus when Chilly Willy comes across his fishing projects.

Paul Smith directed the first Chilly Willy cartoon, simply titled Chilly Willy, in 1953. The initial version of Chilly Willy resembled Woody Woodpecker, except with flippers and black feathers, but he was redesigned in to his more familiar form in subsequent cartoons.

Tex Avery revived the character for two of his shorts, I'm Cold (1954) and the Academy Award nominated The Legend of Rockabye Point (1955). After Avery left the studio, Alex Lovy assumed as director, starting by directing Hot and Cold Penguin.

Chilly was mute in most of his 1950s cartoons and early 1960s cartoons, although he was voiced by Sara Berner in the initial entry. The next time he spoke was in Half-Baked Alaska in 1965, with Daws Butler providing Chilly's voice until the end of the series in a style similar to his Elroy Jetson characterization. The character always speaks in the comic book stories based on the character. Also in the comic book stories, Chilly had two nephews named Ping and Pong, similar to how Woody Woodpecker is uncle to Twins Knothead and Splinter.

When the Lantz cartoons were packaged for television in 1957 as The Woody Woodpecker Show, Chilly Willy was a featured attraction on the show, and has remained such in all later versions of the Woody Woodpecker Show package.

Other appearances
In the 1988 film Who Framed Roger Rabbit, Chilly Willy is mentioned by Eddie's acquaintance Angelo.

Chilly Willy is featured in The New Woody Woodpecker Show where he has no dialogue. Like the shorts, Chilly has gone up against Smedley. Later episodes introduce Sgt. Hogwash (voiced by Blake Clark) and Major Bull (voiced by Kevin Michael Richardson) who operate in an Antarctic military base that Chilly tends to trespass in.

Chilly Willy is a supporting character in the 2018 Woody Woodpecker webseries voiced by Brad Norman and Dee Bradley Baker.

Shorts

See also
 List of Walter Lantz cartoons
 List of Walter Lantz cartoon characters
 Freezie

References

External links
 
ChillyWillyFan.com - fansite
 
 Chilly in Dell Comics
 Chilly in Harvey Comics

Film characters introduced in 1953
Film series introduced in 1953
Fictional penguins
Animated film series
Universal Pictures cartoons and characters
Woody Woodpecker
Fictional characters from Alaska
Male characters in animation
Anthropomorphic birds
Fictional mute characters
Walter Lantz Productions cartoons and characters